Rimmer is a surname. Notable people with the surname include:

 Anne Rimmer (born 1947), New Zealand conservationist and writer 
 Eve Rimmer (1937–1996), New Zealand athlete
 Jimmy Rimmer, English footballer
 Jodie Rimmer (born 1974), New Zealand voice and performer actress
 John Rimmer (1878–1962), British athlete
 Lasse Rimmer (born 1972), Danish entertainer
 Marie Rimmer, British Labour Party politician, Member of Parliament (MP) for St Helens South and Whiston May 2015
 Michael Rimmer (born 1986), English middle distance runner
 Robert Rimmer, author of The Harrad Experiment
 Simon Rimmer (born 1962), English Celebrity chef and television presenter
 Shane Rimmer (1929–2019), Canadian actor
 William Rimmer, English-born American artist
 William Rimmer (music), English composer of brass band music

Fictional characters:
 Arnold Rimmer, a fictional character in the BBC sitcom Red Dwarf
 Michael Rimmer, fictional anti-hero of the film The Rise and Rise of Michael Rimmer

See also
 Glass rimmer, a bar accessory
 Rimer (disambiguation)

English-language surnames